Philipsburg Osceola Senior High School is a public high school located in the borough  of Philipsburg, Pennsylvania, USA. The school serves students from most of western Centre County, as well as Decatur and Boggs Townships in Clearfield County. The school's mascot is the mounties or mountaineers. The school is part of the Philipsburg-Osceola Area School District. It was built in 1959.

Notable alumni
Jon Condo, NFL player - long snapper; Dallas Cowboys (2005), Oakland Raiders (2006–present)
Matt Adams, MLB player - first baseman; St. Louis Cardinals (2012-2017), Washington Nationals (2017–present)

Athletics
Students can participate in the following sports:
 American football
 Basketball (boys and girls)
 Cheerleading
 Soccer (boys and girls)
 Track and field
 Baseball
 Softball
 Wrestling
 Volleyball
 Golf (boys and girls)

Public high schools in Pennsylvania
Schools in Clearfield County, Pennsylvania
1959 establishments in Pennsylvania